WSDM is a radio station broadcasting a Catholic talk radio and sports radio format broadcasting Ave Maria Radio and EWTN programming, as well as North Posey sports.

References

External links

SDM (FM)
Radio stations established in 2002
2002 establishments in Indiana